

Events
August - Christopher Goffe, a former crew member under Rhode Island pirate Captain Thomas Woolerly before receiving a pardon in 1687, is commissioned as a pirate hunter and is ordered to protect the coastal shipping between Cape Cod and Cape Ann. 
September - After twelve years away from his native England, William Dampier arrives at Thames. Nearly destitute after eight years of adventuring, he is forced to sell his friend and manservant Prince Jeoly.

Births

Deaths

See also
1690 in piracy
1691
1693 in piracy
Timeline of piracy

Piracy
Piracy by year